The Pleasure Point Roadhouse was a historic building on the Monterey Bay, located at 2-3905 East Cliff Dr., 95062 in Santa Cruz County, California. It was torn down on September 27, 2008.

Henchy

The house was built between 1902 and 1904 by former San Francisco saloon owner John J. Henchy.
He bought the land that now spans 38th Ave. to 41st Ave. on the coast of Pleasure Point, Santa Cruz, California. Henchy built his home on the property he bought from N E Neary, thus acquiring a natural view of the cove and Monterey Bay.

He built his home in a trapezoidal form that aligned with East Cliff Dr.
The second story living area and master bedroom had great ocean views. A long, enclosed light-filled gallery wrapped around the east and south sides of the main floor and created a sun porch.  The front deck afforded an expansive ocean view.
It had many elements derived from the Early Craftsman Style thinking.
Henchy's large shingle-sided house and drive-through carriage house were the first large impressive buildings in the area.

The dining room opened off the living room and was adjacent to the kitchen. The kitchen opened into the windowed breakfast area with views
to the natural setting and mountains behind.

The wood-paneled attic room, used as the reading room, took advantage of the natural, wooded ocean setting with its hardwood floors and windows.

The front door opened directly into the living room, which in turn connected to the dining room. Often, the two rooms were separated only by a half wall.

Architect
The Roadhouse pre-dated the American Craftsman style, yet contained many of the elements that are found in it.
The Roadhouse may be the trend setter that led to the Craftsman shingle style Berkeley style made well known by Julia Morgan, Bernard Maybeck and Greene and Greene. It reflects many of the concepts found in The Simple Home, Charles Keeler, 1906, a great influence on the Craftsman School.

This century-old home, with the visual clues and the proximity of this site to Esty/Houghton home, leads historians to believe that is an L D Esty home. (see Ross)
HisPogonip Clubhouse is on the National Register of Historic Places.

History of ownership

It was owned and occupied by a number of locally successful families.
1908 N Neary
1921 J Menzel
1926 Anton V Peterson  Built the gas station, store and Cosy Cottage Resort.
1971 Liela Naslund of Los Gatos bought the property. She removed the gas station and store. She rented the rooms and cottages and kept an apartment on the lower back floor.

Effort for historic listing
2007 The county in updating historic property inventory had the Roadhouse nominated by the Live Oak History group as one of its highest priorities for listing. Activist Charles Paulden worked with the group. He also started up a group called People for the Preservation of Pleasure Point. The group wanted it preserved as a landmark and Paulden said that it should be restored and used as a museum or community center.

Anthony Kirk was hired by the absentee homeowner to challenge the Historic designation. The tenants were evicted and the property fenced with chain link. Also barbed wire erected around the property. It is rumored that the owner's daughters gave the tenants 60 days to vacate.

The County of Santa Cruz is considering it as a park.

It was torn down on September 27, 2008.

Part of the heavy plastic outdoor furniture was bought by Judith & Buck Hoelscher and is now being used at their Vacation Rental, The Tudor Rose Manor's yard in the flats in Rio del Mar beach area.

Sources
 Ross Gibson HISTORIC SIGNIFICANCE OF THE PLEASURE POINT ROADHOUSE, 2007 2007 DPR for 2-3905 East Cliff Dr., Santa Cruz, Ca 95062
 Norm Poltevan 2007 research for History Journal
 Carol Swift 2007 DPR for 2-3905 East Cliff Dr., Santa Cruz, Ca 95062

References

External links
Pleasure Point Roadhouse article in National Preservation Trust online 
Phil Reader

It has been nominated to be listed as a Cultural Resource.
 www.mcpost.com
 National Trust Magazine: Santa Cruz Considers Landmarking 1902 Saloon
 The County of Santa Cruz is considering it as a park site

In 2006, it became the focal point in a local debate over property rights, eminent domain and historic preservation. 

In 2007, while being consider for listing, the long term renters were evicted  by the absentee landlords and the property became off limits to the public. 

References to County record at links found on ipetitions.com/petition/saveroadhouse/

Craftsman Perspective
 http://www.craftsmanperspective.com/

American Craftsman architecture in California
Houses in Santa Cruz County, California
Houses completed in 1904
Buildings and structures demolished in 2008